Panachage (from French meaning "blend, mixture") is the name given to a procedure provided for in several open-list variants of the party-list proportional representation system. It gives voters more than one vote in the same ballot and allows them to distribute their votes between or among individual candidates from different party lists.  It is used in elections at all levels in Liechtenstein, Luxembourg, and Switzerland; in congressional elections in Ecuador, El Salvador, and Honduras; and in local elections in a majority of German states, in Czechia, and in French communes with under 1,000 inhabitants.

Among non-proportional systems, plurality-at-large voting, limited voting, and cumulative voting can also allow individuals to distribute their votes between candidates from different parties.

Fictitious example 
The Central Strelsau constituency in the Ruritanian Assembly of the Republic elects six members. Three lists, containing twenty-two candidates in total, are vying for its seats. There are 6,750 voters, and the voters can each select a maximum of six candidates and seats are distributed by the D´Hondt method..

The list totals mean that, on the basis of proportionality, the Social Democratic Party is entitled to three seats, National Consolidation two, and the League of Concerned Citizens one.

For the SDP, Megan Vargas and Matt Wright are elected first and second, and the tie for third place on the SDP list is broken in favor of the highest-ranked candidate: Pranav Kapoor. However, Megan Vargas – a non-political celebrity placed last on the list as a sign of endorsement – in the event declines election; accordingly, her place is taken by the next highest-ranked candidate: namely, Judy Bogart.
Tricia Chapman and Bob Jones are the two list members elected for National Consolidation. 
Sam Miller is initially elected for the LCC, but also declines election – in this case with the intention of ensuring that his list's leading candidate, Sylvia Ambrosetti, gets a seat.

The effects that panachage can have on an election can be demonstrated simply by comparing these results with those that would have been obtained under a closed-list system:

Only three of the candidates who would have been elected under the closed list were also initially elected under panachage. Of the two who declined election, only one was replaced by a presumptive closed-list electee.

Argentina
From 1912 to 1948, argentinian voters had the possibility of crossing out or adding candidates to the electoral lists of the legislative elections.

Belgium
Until an 1899 reform in favour of an open-list electoral system and the parliamentary elections in 1900, panachage was possible in provincial and parliamentary elections in Belgium. Candidates were placed on lists in alphabetical order of surname.

Municipal elections were held under the panachage system until passage of the 5 July 1976 Law. This change was adopted before the first elections (October 1976) following the 1976 communes merger, which reduced the number of Belgian communes from 2,359 to 596. Bills were introduced in 1995 and 1999 by senators from the Volksunie to reinstitute panachage, but they were never put to votes.

Ecuador
In the Ecuadorian parliamentary elections, voters have as many votes as there are seats to be filled. They may use their votes to support candidates across party lines (and they may also give several votes to a single candidate).

El Salvador
El Salvador adopted an open list proportional system for the 2012 legislative elections. It introduced panachage for the 2015 elections: 
"For the first time, voters will be able to select individual candidates from any party rather than being forced to vote for a single party with an established list of candidates. Voters can still opt to simply choose a party.".

France
Since 2014, voters in municipal elections in communes having fewer than 1,000 inhabitants (at the time: 26,879 communes, representing 73.5% of the total) have been able to cast ballot papers indicating their preference for candidates either listed or named individually, and, in addition, cross out if they so wish the names of one or more candidates. (Before that time, the upper population limit for communes qualified for this system of voting had been 3,500.) The number of candidates selected by a voter must not, however, exceed the total number of available seats.

Until a reform effective 17 May 2013, voters had been able to write in the names of other, unlisted eligible citizens. But now all nominations must be filed in advance with the prefecture or sub-prefecture, and voters may no longer add names on election day.

Germany
Of sixteen federal states, two of them, Bremen and Hamburg - both of which are city-states - adopted electoral systems including panachage (Panaschieren) for state and municipal elections. Eleven others use the system only for municipal elections. Except in Schleswig-Holstein, in the states allowing panachage, the voter may give more than one vote for one or several candidate(s) (Kumulieren). Berlin, North Rhine-Westphalia and Saarland are three states that do not use panachage at all.

Honduras
Panachage within an open list proportional system has been used since 2005 for legislative elections in Honduras.

Italy
The Italian concept of voto disgiunto is not equivalent to the panachage concept as understood in other countries. It means the possibility at regional and municipal elections (in communes over 15,000 inhabitants) to vote for a list or a specific candidate on it (whose name has to be written on the ballot paper by the voter), and for a candidate to the presidency or the mayorship who may be on another list. This system is not used for provincial elections.

Liechtenstein
For legislative elections in Liechtenstein, there are two constituencies, Oberland and Unterland. The first has 15 seats, the second ten. The voter must use only one ballot paper from one party, and has the right to vote for as many candidates as there are seats to be filled: this may mean either all the candidates on the party list, or some of them and other candidates, added in handwriting under "deleted" candidates. Using highlighters, writing comments on the ballot paper, or putting more than one ballot paper in the ballot envelope voids the vote.

Luxembourg
In all proportional elections, such as those for the Chamber of Deputies, a voter in Luxembourg has as many votes as there are seats to be filled in that constituency. The individual may vote either for candidates on the same list or for candidates on different lists and may allocate up to two votes to a single candidate.

Switzerland
In Switzerland, in addition to being able to distribute their votes between different lists (panachage), voters may add names to lists, and/or delete one or more of the names appearing on others. This system was also used in Austria until the 1970s.

References 

Mixed electoral systems